Rajan Tiwari is a former Member of the Legislative Assembly  (MLA) from Bihar, India. He contested his first election as an independent candidate in the year 2000 and got elected to the Bihar Legislative Assembly.

Family 
Rajan Tiwari is the son of Kanti Devi Tiwari (mother) and Vishwajeewan Ram  Tiwari (father).

Rajan Tiwari belongs to the Hindu community and originally hails from Gorakhpur. His younger brother Raju Tiwari is MLA from the Govindganj constituency in Bihar.

Political career 
Rajan Tiwari started his political career in year 2000 when he defeated Bhupendra Nath Dubey of SAP 2000.
In 2006, his mother Kanti Devi was elected Block Head from the local block and continues to hold the post.

References 

 https://aajtak.intoday.in/crime/story/mafia-rajan-tiwari-returned-from-the-bihar-for-up-election-2017-1-904302.html

Bihar MLAs 2000–2005
Living people
Lok Janshakti Party politicians
Year of birth missing (living people)
People from East Champaran district